Veda Scott is an American professional wrestler. She has wrestled for various American promotions, including Ring of Honor (ROH), Total Nonstop Action Wrestling (TNA), Shimmer Women Athletes, and Absolute Intense Wrestling (AIW). She has also wrestled internationally in Canada and Japan.

Professional wrestling career

American independent circuit (2011–2014)
Scott debuted in May 2011. Her earliest recorded match took place on May 15, 2011 at a Horizon Wrestling Alliance event, where they were defeated by Daizee Haze.

Scott started wrestling for Absolute Intense Wrestling (AIW) on July 29, 2011 with a loss to Cherry Bomb at Girls Night Out 4. In the second half of 2012, Gregory Iron employed Scott as his legal counsel, and they helped him implement a stipulation that he, the "Handicapped Hero", could only be pinned with a count of four instead of the standard three. On November 23, 2012 at Hell on Earth 8, Iron and Scott defeated defending champions The Batiri (Kodama and Obariyon) to capture the AIW Tag Team Championship. Known together as Hope and Change, they were known to have won and defended their title through nefarious means, and thus racked up successful title defenses against various teams including the Batiri, Youthanazia (Josh Prohibition and Matt Cross), the Old School Express (Jock Samson and Marion Fontaine) and the Jollyville Fuck-Its (Russ Myers and T-Money). Hope and Change remained champions until Absolution VIII on June 30, 2013, when they lost their titles back to the Batiri.

On March 1, 2013 at Girls Night Out 8, Scott won the main event ladder match against Addy Starr, Athena and Crazy Mary Dobson to earn a future shot at the AIW Women's Title. On October 6, 2013 at Girls Night Out 10, Scott lost their main event championship match against AIW Women's Champion Allysin Kay. On February 7, 2014 at #TGIF, Scott lost a rematch for the title to Kay. Scott's tag team with Iron started to fracture in November 2013, resulting in their feuding with each other. This culminated in Scott defeating Iron in the main event steel cage match at Battle of the Sexes on July 26, 2014.

In July 2012, Scott debuted for Shine Wrestling at the Shine 1 Internet pay-per-view, where they defeated Kimberly.

On May 10, 2014, Scott made their debut for Total Nonstop Action Wrestling at the tapings of TNA's One Night Only Knockouts Knockdown pay-per-view, where they lost to Gail Kim.

Shimmer Women Athletes (2011–2018)
Scott joined Shimmer Women Athletes in October 2011, when they wrestled an un-aired tag team match before the DVD tapings of Volume 41 and Volume 42. Scott's first aired match for Shimmer came about on Volume 44 that same month, where they lost a singles match to Taylor Made. On Volume 46, Scott gained their first victory after her opponent Saraya Knight was disqualified.

Ring of Honor (2012–2016)
Scott was trained in Ring of Honor's (ROH) Wrestling Academy under Daizee Haze and Delirious.

In January 2012, Scott debuted in ROH as a backstage interviewer, playing this role throughout 2012 and into 2013, including on ROH's television episodes. From February 2013, in addition to their interviewing duties, Scott began working as a commentator for the female wrestlers' matches in ROH. On the March 23, 2013 episode of ROH Wrestling, Scott was taken hostage by the group S.C.U.M., who only released them upon agreeing to a deal for matches featuring S.C.U.M. vs the ROH roster on the next episode. At the Supercard of Honor VII internet pay-per-view, Scott helped ward off interference from S.C.U.M. during S.C.U.M. member Kevin Steen's ROH World Title match against Jay Briscoe, eventually leading to Briscoe capturing the title.

On the April 6, 2013 episode of ROH Wrestling, Scott interviewed MsChif, who had just lost for the first time since her return. In response, MsChif attacked Scott by spraying mist into their face. On the May 25, episode of ROH Wrestling, Scott vowed revenge and their interference cost MsChif a singles match. On the July 7, 2013 episode of ROH Wrestling, Scott had their first televised match for ROH and lost to MsChif.

In January 2014, Scott entered a storyline, where she began managing R.D. Evans when he began gloating about his win streak, which he dubbed the "New Streak", As a part of storyline, she would put him in match with jobbers in order to win easily. At the ROH Unauthorized presents: "Michael Bennett's Bachelor Party" pay-per-view, Scott teamed up with Heather Patera and Leah von Dutch defeating Taeler Hendrix, "Crazy" Mary Dobson and Scarlett Bordeaux when Scott pinned Bordeaux after a back-drop driver.

Scott began acting as Cedric Alexander's manager at Best in the World 2015 after the latter attacked Moose who Scott had previously managed, turning heel in the process. On December 2, 2016, Ring of Honor had announced that Scott requested their release from their contract.

International exploits (2012–present)
On July 7, 2012, Scott was noted to have wrestled in Canada for NCW Femmes Fatales, where they defeated Mary Lee Rose.

Scott wrestled their first match in Japan at Joshi for Hope IV on October 7, 2012, where they lost to Yuhi.

Total Nonstop Action Wrestling (2014, 2016)
On May 10, 2014, Scott made their debut for Total Nonstop Action Wrestling at the tapings of TNA's One Night Only Knockouts Knockdown pay-per-view, where they lost to Gail Kim. On November 7, 2014 PPV, Scott competed in TNA One Night Only: Knockouts Knockdown 2 losing to Gail Kim. On April 22, 2016 PPV, Scott competed in TNA One Night Only: Knockouts Knockdown 4 losing to Rosemary.

International Wrestling Syndicate (2017–present)
Scott made her IWS debut on August 5, 2017 at Scarred 4 Life, as Stefany Sinclair became the first-ever IWS Women's Champion by defeating Scott and Kath Von Goth, in the inaugural IWS Women's Title Three Way Match. On April 6, 2019 at Unstoppable, Addy Starr defeated Solo Darling and Scott in the first IWS Women's Championship international contest, held at White Eagle Hall in Jersey City, as part of GCW's The Collective. On October 16, 2021 at Scarred for Life, Scott defeated Addy Starr for the IWS World Women's Championship.

All Elite Wrestling (2020) 
Scott was part of the commentary team for AEW's Women's Tag Team Cup Tournament: The Deadly Draw, which began on August 3, 2020. After the conclusion of the tournament, she joined the commentary team on AEW Dark.

Personal life
Scott was studying law during her professional wrestling debut in 2011, and graduated from the Drexel University School of Law in 2012. She was also a former Drexel Law Review editor.

Scott is a vegan. She is non-binary and uses she and they pronouns. Scott has been engaged to fellow professional wrestler Mike Bailey since 2020, and they got married in May 2022.

Championships and accomplishments
 Absolute Intense Wrestling
 AIW Women's Championship (1 time)
 AIW Tag Team Championship (1 time) – with Gregory Iron
 DDT Pro-Wrestling
 Ironman Heavymetalweight Championship (1 time)
 Family Wrestling Entertainment
 FWE Women's Championship (1 time)
 Inspire Pro Wrestling
 Inspire Pro XX Division Championship (1 time)
 International Wrestling Syndicate
 IWS World Women's Championship (1 time, current)
 Legacy Wrestling
 Legacy Wrestling Women's Championship (1 time)
 Pro Wrestling Illustrated
 Rookie of the Year (2012)
 Ranked No. 43 of the best 50 female singles wrestlers in the PWI Female 50 in 2013.

References

External links
 
 

1984 births
Living people
Sportspeople from Providence, Rhode Island
American female professional wrestlers
Professional wrestlers from Rhode Island
Professional wrestling managers and valets
Professional wrestling announcers
Drexel University alumni
21st-century American women
21st-century professional wrestlers
Ironman Heavymetalweight Champions